Eboda smaragdinana is a species of moth of the family Tortricidae. It is found in Sri Lanka, New Guinea, the Admiralty Islands and the Solomon Islands.

It has a wingspan of 14–18 mm, head and thorax are green, palpi white spotted with olive green, forewings deep emerald green.

References

Moths described in 1866
Tortricini